Illmo is a former community and neighborhood of Scott City, Missouri.

Illmo had its start in 1905 with construction of the nearby Thebes Bridge which connects Illinois and Missouri. The name Illmo is a contraction of Illinois and Missouri. A post office called Illmo was established in 1904, and remained in operation until 1982. Illmo was annexed by Scott City in 1980.

References

Populated places in Scott County, Missouri